Jade is an American girl group, originally composed of Joi Marshall, Tonya Kelly, and Di Reed.

History

The group Jade was originally composed of Joi Marshall, Angela Slates and Debra Mitchell and, as such, was first known as JAD.  Producer Vassal Benford sold the song "I Wanna Love You" before Marshall, Slates and Mitchell’s voices were recorded on the song.  In order to keep the song on the soundtrack for the 1992 Kid 'n Play comedy Class Act, Benford had to reproduce the song with the actual voices of the group members.  When that could not be accomplished he implored the record label to drop Slates and Mitchell from the group and replace them with Di Reed and Tonya Kelly who were the voices on the song and who were signed to his production company.

Tonya Kelly and Di Reed were signed on by producer Vassal Benford, and the group's name was extended to Jade. Tonya grew up in Chicago listening to jazz vocalists such as Sarah Vaughan and Nat King Cole. Joi Marshall was also from Chicago but was raised on Motown, especially Diana Ross. Di Reed grew up in Houston singing gospel anywhere she could.

Jade's first success was on the Class Act soundtrack in 1992. Their hit single "I Wanna Love You" was one of the breakout songs on the soundtrack, cracking the Top 10 of the R&B charts and reaching #16 on the Billboard Hot 100. Their follow-up single "Don't Walk Away", was their biggest hit and climbed to #2 on the R&B chart and was certified gold by the RIAA in 1993. The single went on to sell 1.5 million copies worldwide. Subsequent singles "Looking for Mr. Do Right" and "One Woman" helped push their debut album Jade to the Max to platinum status, sparking a lengthy tour and spots on The Tonight Show, The Arsenio Hall Show, and the U.K.'s Top of the Pops.

Jade also performed on BET's Listening Party Live. The session was recorded and released as a CD in 1993. Jade was the only group to have a BET Listening Party album released.

In 1994 the band appeared in the movie The Inkwell, and released their second studio album Mind, Body & Song, on which they served as co-writers and co-producers. Singles "5-4-3-2 (Yo! Time Is Up)" and "Every Day of the Week" propelled the album to gold status.

Jade also appeared on Beverly Hills, 90210 in the episode, "You've Got To Have Heart", which aired on February 8, 1995. During their appearance, they performed "Every Day of the Week". Thereafter, Tonya Kelly left the group, then briefly reunited with Joi Marshall in 1997 to contribute the track "Keep on Risin" to the soundtrack for the film The Sixth Man. With TLC, SWV, Xscape and other female singers, the trio appeared on "Freedom", which first appeared on the soundtrack to the 1995 film of the same title, Panther.

The song "5-4-3-2 (Yo! Time Is Up)" was used as part of the soundtrack for the New York Undercover episode "Eyewitness Blues".

Current activities
Di Reed is currently touring the world as a featured vocalist for Rod Stewart and continues to back up such artists as Stevie Wonder, Smokey Robinson, Christina Aguilera, Elton John, Gwen Stefani, among others.

The original members of Jade (JAD) went on to become successful in their own right.  Angela Slates became a successful music producer (producing songs for Trina & Tamara, Tony! Toni! Toné!, Vybe, Somethin' for the People and Eric Benét), and earned a Ph.D. in education. Debra Mitchell (now known as Debra Mitchell-Adams) became a member of the group Vybe on Island Records, and owns Legacy Global Music Group.

In February 2018, Joi Marshall debuted her new solo single "Love Language."

As of 2022, Jade is currently touring with original members Joi Marshall, Tonya Kelly and "guest" Myracle Holloway.

Discography

Studio albums

Live albums

Singles

Featured singles

 Jade did not have hits in the UK until March 1993, with Don't Walk Away being the lead single and I Wanna Love You being the 2nd hit in July, followed by One Woman in September '93. Every Day of the Week didn't chart in the UK until February 1995.

Awards and nominations

References

External links
 Di Reed's Instagram page
 Joi Marshall's Instagram page
 Tonya Kelly's Instagram page
 

American girl groups
African-American girl groups
American hip hop groups
American contemporary R&B musical groups
American soul musical groups
Giant Records (Warner) artists
New jack swing music groups
American pop girl groups